Koivujärvi is a medium-sized lake in Finland. It belongs to Kymijoki main catchment area and it is situated in Kiuruvesi municipality, Northern Savonia region. It is one of the northeast lakes belonging to the Kymijoki basin. Koivujärvi is a common name. There are 21 lakes with this name in Finland. Koivujärvi in Kiuruvesi is the biggest of these lakes.

See also
List of lakes in Finland

References

Lakes of Keitele
Lakes of Pielavesi
Lakes of Kiuruvesi